The 2017 Girabola was the 39th season of top-tier football in Angola. The season ran from 10 February to 5 November 2017.

The league comprised 16 teams and the bottom three teams were relegated to the 2018 Provincial stages.

Teams
A total of 16 teams contested the league, including 13 sides from the 2016 season and three promoted from the 2016 Segundona - Bravos do Maquis, J.G.M. and Santa Rita de Cássia.

On the other hand, 4 de Abril do K.K., Porcelana F.C. and Primeiro de Maio were the last three teams of the 2016 season and played in the Segundona for the 2018 season. Clube Desportivo Primeiro de Agosto were the defending champions from the 2016 season.

On January 23, 2017, Benfica de Luanda issued a press release stating that it would no longer participate in the Girabola, with effect from 2017 and until further notice, citing financial reasons, and that the club would focus on its youth academy and in turning the club into a sports company. 

For the repechage to fill the spot of Benfica de Luanda, a round-robin qualifier tournament was announced to be contested by the three relegated teams in the 2016 Girabola plus the two top-ranked teams in the 2016 Segundona. As four of the five invited teams declined to participate on financial grounds, Primeiro de Maio was selected to replace Benfica de Luanda.

Estádio 4 de Janeiro disaster
On February 10, 2017, during the inaugural match between home team Santa Rita de Cássia and Recreativo do Libolo, one of the access gates of Estádio 4 de Janeiro collapsed as supporters tried to force their way into the stadium. As a result, 17 people were trampled to death and 76 injured, 5 of whom with life-threatening injuries. The incident began just about 6 minutes from the beginning of the match with the match pursuing its normal course until the end and no one inside the stadium realizing what was going on. The Police has reportedly used tear gas to disperse angry supporters.

Changes from 2016 season
Relegated: 4 de Abril do Cuando, Porcelana, 1º de Maio 
Promoted: Bravos do Maquis, Desportivo JGM, Santa Rita de Cássia
Withdrew: Benfica de Luanda
Nominated: 1º de Maio

Progresso da Lunda Sul relegation
Progresso da Lunda Sul was relegated for fielding an ineligible player on its 29th round match against Académica do Lobito. As the club was struggling with financial trouble, they had initially been awarded a 3-0 defeat in their round 20 home match against Progresso do Sambizanga.

Stadiums and locations

League table

Results

Positions by round

Clubs season progress

Season statistics

Top scorers

Hat-tricks

References

External links
Girabola 2017 stats at jornaldosdesportos.sapo.ao
Federação Angolana de Futebol

Girabola seasons
Girabola
Angola